Laura Bryna is an American country music singer. She has released one album, Trying to Be Me, for the defunct Equity Music Group label, and has been involved in the Make-A-Wish Foundation.

Biography
Laura Bryna was born in Mount Airy, Maryland. When she was young, she gained an interest in country music on road trips to Washington, D.C. while her brother was in a hospital there. After attending Philadelphia's University of the Arts, she starred in a musical called Rasputin and moved to Nashville, Tennessee. There, she got internships at Sony Tree Publishing and DreamWorks Publishing, and later signed to Equity Music Group, a label owned by singer Clint Black, in January 2006. Mike Kraski, head of the label, said that he became aware of Bryna after she co-wrote and recorded song titled "Make a Wish" for the Make-A-Wish Foundation.

Bryna toured with Black in late 2007 before Equity released her debut album, Trying to Be Me, in January 2008. To promote the album, Bryna broadcast the music video for the single "Make a Wish" on flat-screen monitors in the Luxor and Excalibur Hotel and Casino in Las Vegas for one month. She also performed at the Fashion Show Mall and had  images of herself on top of the Luxor's tower. On January 14, she held a release party for the album at the Luxor, and included a bonus track called "I Don't Have a Thing to Wear" on a special edition of the album which was released only at the Luxor and Excalibur.

In April 2008, Bryna joined the board of directors for the Make-A-Wish Foundation of the Mid-Atlantic. She also released another single, "Life Is Good", in early 2008. Bryna left Equity in December 2008 when Black closed the label. She has continued to tour and perform at various venues, including a performance at the House of Blues in 2009. In 2010, she became the host of GoTV Networks' True Country show.

Discography

Albums

Singles

Music videos

References

External links

Living people
People from Mount Airy, Maryland
American country singer-songwriters
Equity Music Group artists
Country musicians from Maryland
Singers from Maryland
21st-century American women singers
Year of birth missing (living people)